Secondo Ricci (8 October 1913 – 13 January 1984) was an Italian footballer who played as a defender. On 14 April 1940, he represented the Italy national football team on the occasion of a friendly match against Romania in a 2–1 home win.

Honours

Player
Bologna
Serie A: 1938–39, 1938–39 Serie A

References

1913 births
1984 deaths
Italian footballers
Italy international footballers
Association football defenders
U.S. Russi players
Ravenna F.C. players
Bologna F.C. 1909 players